SM UB-111 was a German Type UB III submarine or U-boat in the German Imperial Navy during World War I. She was commissioned into the German Imperial Navy on 5 April 1918 as SM UB-111.

UB-111 was surrendered to Britain on 21 November 1918 in accordance with the requirements of the Armistice with Germany and broken up in Bo'ness in 1919-20.

Construction

She was built by Blohm & Voss of Hamburg and following just under a year of construction, launched at Hamburg on 1 September 1917. UB-111 was commissioned in the spring the next year under the command of Kptlt. Egon von Werner. Like all Type UB III submarines, UB-111 carried 10 torpedoes and was armed with a  deck gun. UB-111 had a displacement of  while surfaced and  when submerged. Her engines enabled her to travel at  when surfaced and  when submerged.

Summary of raiding history

References

Notes

Citations

Bibliography 

 

German Type UB III submarines
World War I submarines of Germany
U-boats commissioned in 1918
1917 ships
Ships built in Hamburg